Amanda Ribas (born August 26, 1993) is a Brazilian professional mixed martial artist. She currently competes in the Strawweight division in the Ultimate Fighting Championship (UFC). As of March 7, 2023, she is #9 in the UFC women's flyweight rankings, and #11 in the UFC women's strawweight rankings.

Background
The Varginha native is the daughter of Marcelo Ribas, a judo and Jiu-jitsu coach who also teaches Muay Thai. She trained under her father until she was part of one of the national judo youth teams in Brazil. She stopped training and competing for some years after suffering knee injuries. She started to train and compete again after seeing some of her colleagues training for an MMA tournament.

Mixed martial arts career

Early career 
After winning 2014 IMMAF World Championship in the Women's Flyweight division, Ribas started her professional MMA career in 2014 and fought primarily in Brazil. She amassed a record of 6–1 prior to being signed by UFC.

Ultimate Fighting Championship

Ribas was scheduled to face Juliana Lima at The Ultimate Fighter 25 Finale on July 7, 2017. However, Ribas was flagged by USADA for a potential anti-doping violation and removed from the bout. The possible violation stems from a sample collected June 7. She was replaced by Tecia Torres. She initially received a two-year sanction by USADA after testing positive for Ostarine, but the suspension was terminated on May 3, 2019 as USADA determined that the positive test was the result of an ostarine contaminated dietary supplement.

In her UFC debut, Ribas faced Emily Whitmire on June 29, 2019 at UFC on ESPN 3. She won the fight via a rear-naked choke submission in the second round.

On October 12, 2019 Ribas faced Mackenzie Dern at UFC Fight Night: Joanna vs. Waterson. She won the fight via unanimous decision.

Ribas was scheduled to face Paige VanZant on March 14, 2020 at UFC Fight Night: Lee vs. Oliveira. However, VanZant was forced to pull out of the fight due to fracturing her right arm, and she was replaced by Randa Markos. She won the fight via unanimous decision.

The bout with VanZant was rescheduled and eventually took place at UFC 251 on July 12, 2020. Ribas won the fight via a submission in round one.

Ribas was expected to face Carla Esparza on December 12, 2020 at UFC 256. However, on October 9, it was announced that Esparza was pulled due to undisclosed reasons. Instead, Ribas was scheduled to face Michelle Waterson on January 24, 2021 at UFC 257. However, it was reported on December 8, 2020 that Waterson was forced out of the event, and she was replaced by Marina Rodriguez. Ribas lost the fight via technical knockout in round two.

Ribas was scheduled to meet Angela Hill on May 8, 2021 at UFC on ESPN 24.  However, the day of the event Ribas was removed from the bout due to COVID-19 protocols and the bout was cancelled. The bout was rescheduled for UFC Fight Night 189 on June 5, 2021. Two weeks later, the pairing was scrapped once again as Ribas was still suffering from lingering COVID-19 symptoms.

Ribas faced Virna Jandiroba on October 30, 2021 at UFC 267. She won the bout via unanimous decision.

Ribas was again scheduled to face Michelle Waterson on March 26, 2022 at UFC Fight Night 205. However, the bout was postponed to UFC 274 on May 7, 2022 due to Waterson sustaining an undisclosed injury before she ultimately was ruled out of the bout in mid-March.

Ribas faced Katlyn Chookagian on May 14, 2022 at UFC on ESPN 36. She lost the close bout via split decision. The bout earned Ribas her first Fight of the Night bonus award.

Ribas was scheduled to face Tracy Cortez on December 3, 2022 at UFC on ESPN 42. However, shortly after the official weigh-ins, the promotion announced Cortez was pulled from the bout due to an unspecified medical issue and the bout was cancelled.

Ribas faced Viviane Araújo on March 4, 2023, at UFC 285. She won the fight via unanimous decision.

Championships and awards

Mixed martial arts
Ultimate Fighting Championship
Fight of the Night (One time) 
Jungle Fight
Jungle Fight Strawweight Championship (One time)
Max Fight
MF Strawweight Championship (One time)

Mixed martial arts record

|-
|Win
|align=center|12–3
|Viviane Araújo
|Decision (unanimous)
|UFC 285
|
|align=center|3
|align=center|5:00
|Las Vegas, Nevada, United States
|
|-
|Loss
|align=center|11–3
|Katlyn Chookagian 
|Decision (split)
|UFC on ESPN: Błachowicz vs. Rakić
|
|align=center|3
|align=center|5:00
|Las Vegas, Nevada, United States
|
|-
|Win
|align=center|11–2
|Virna Jandiroba 
|Decision (unanimous)
|UFC 267 
|
|align=center|3
|align=center|5:00
|Abu Dhabi, United Arab Emirates
|
|-
|Loss
|align=center|10–2
|Marina Rodriguez
|TKO (elbow and punches)
|UFC 257
|
|align=center|2
|align=center|0:54
|Abu Dhabi, United Arab Emirates
|
|-
|Win
|align=center|10–1
|Paige VanZant
|Submission (armbar)
|UFC 251 
|
|align=center|1
|align=center|2:21
|Abu Dhabi, United Arab Emirates
|
|-
|Win
|align=center|9–1
|Randa Markos
|Decision (unanimous)
|UFC Fight Night: Lee vs. Oliveira 
|
|align=center|3
|align=center|5:00
|Brasília, Brazil
|
|-
| Win
| align=center| 8–1
| Mackenzie Dern
| Decision (unanimous)
| UFC Fight Night: Joanna vs. Waterson
| 
| align=center| 3
| align=center| 5:00
| Tampa, Florida, United States
|
|-
| Win
| align=center| 7–1
| Emily Whitmire
| Submission (rear-naked choke)
| UFC on ESPN: Ngannou vs. dos Santos
| 
| align=center| 2
| align=center| 2:10
| Minneapolis, Minnesota, United States
|
|-
| Win
| align=center| 6–1
| Jennifer Gonzalez Araneda
| TKO (punches)
| Max Fight 18
| 
| align=center| 2
| align=center| 0:42
| Varginha, Brazil
|
|-
| Loss
| align=center| 5–1
| Polyana Viana
| KO (punches)
| Jungle Fight 83
| 
| align=center| 1
| align=center| 2:54
| Rio de Janeiro, Brazil
|
|-
| Win
| align=center| 5–0
| Tania Pereda
| Submission (rear-naked choke)
| Jungle Fight 79
| 
| align=center| 1
| align=center| 1:16
| Rio de Janeiro, Brazil
|
|-
| Win
| align=center| 4–0
| Aline Sattelmayer
| Decision (unanimous)
| Jungle Fight 76
| 
| align=center| 3
| align=center| 5:00
| São Paulo, Brazil
|
|-
| Win
| align=center| 3–0
| Iara Sales
| TKO (punches)
| Pentagon Combat 20
| 
| align=center| 1
| align=center| 0:36
| Varginha, Brazil
|
|-
| Win
| align=center| 2–0
| Ariane Carnelossi
| Submission (kneebar)
| Pentagon Combat 20
| 
| align=center| 1
| align=center| 4:14
| Varginha, Brazil
|
|-
| Win
| align=center| 1–0
| Jéssica Almeida
| TKO (punches)
| Pentagon Combat 19
| 
| align=center| 1
| align=center| 0:42
| Boa Esperança, Brazil
|
|-

See also
List of current UFC fighters
List of female mixed martial artists

References

External links
 
 
 

Living people
1989 births
Sportspeople from Bahia
Strawweight mixed martial artists
Brazilian female mixed martial artists
Mixed martial artists utilizing judo
Mixed martial artists utilizing Brazilian jiu-jitsu
Brazilian practitioners of Brazilian jiu-jitsu
People awarded a black belt in Brazilian jiu-jitsu
Female Brazilian jiu-jitsu practitioners
Brazilian female judoka
Ultimate Fighting Championship female fighters
21st-century Brazilian women